WAGF may refer to:

 WAGF-FM, a radio station (101.3 FM) licensed to serve Dothan, Alabama, United States
 WDSA, a radio station (1320 AM) licensed to serve Dothan, Alabama, which held the call sign WAGF from 1932 to 1983 and from 1985 to 2018
 Assemblies of God, officially the World Assemblies of God Fellowship